Cappucci is a surname. Notable people with the surname include:

 Enrico Cappucci (1910–1976), American politician 
 Joseph J. Cappucci (1913–1992), U.S. Air Force Brigadier General

Surnames of Italian origin